WBAK is a radio station in Belfast, Maine, United States.

WBAK may also refer to:

 WAWV-TV, a television station in Terre Haute, Indiana, United States, that held station callsign WBAK-TV from 1977 to 2005
 Anduki Airfield, an airfield in Seria, Brunei, ICAO code WBAK
 WHP (AM), a radio station in Harrisburg, Pennsylvania, United States, that held station callsign WBAK in the 1930s